The EMD FL9 (New Haven Class EDER-5) is a model of electro-diesel locomotive, capable of operating either as a traditional diesel-electric locomotive or as an electric locomotive powered from a third rail. Sixty units were built between October 1956 and November 1960 by General Motors Electro-Motive Division for the New York, New Haven and Hartford Railroad (the "New Haven").

Design
Due to concerns about diesel emissions in the East River Tunnels and the underground tracks of Grand Central Terminal and Penn Station, passenger trains entering New York City have long been required to use electrical power, as coal and later diesel exhaust would pose a hazard to human health in the confined underground spaces. At the same time, much of the New Haven's trackage was not electrified beyond New Haven. To allow passenger trains to travel to New York City from non-electrified lines without requiring a change of locomotives, the New Haven Railroad purchased a class of locomotive that could switch between diesel and electric power on the fly.

EMD's answer was a new locomotive based on their existing FP9, but lengthened to accommodate additional equipment, such as a larger train heating steam boiler and third rail contact shoes. Due to the additional weight, the locomotive was equipped with a three-axle rear truck, giving it an uncommon B-A1A wheel arrangement. Flexicoil trucks were used due to this type of truck having more room for fitting the third rail shoes.

For electric operation, the FL9 was capable of using either an over-running or under-running third rail by means of retractable shoes operated by pneumatic cylinders. The first 30 locomotives also had a small DC pantograph for use within New York City's Grand Central Terminal, where long gaps exist in the third rail because of the complex trackage that includes numerous railroad switches. For operation into the Pennsylvania Railroad's Pennsylvania Station, the FL9 used the Long Island Rail Road's third rail system.

The electrical supply available from the third rail—660 V DC—was identical to the requirements of diesel locomotive traction motors, enabling a fairly easy conversion to a dual-power locomotive. A DC electric compressor provided air for the brake system until the diesel engine was started. Two batches of FL9s were built; an initial 30 (including the original test units 2000 and 2001, originally built with a Blomberg front truck, but later upgraded following testing) from October 1956 through November 1957 with the older  V16 EMD 567C engine; and an additional 30 between June and November 1960 with the newer  V16 EMD 567D1 engine. All units were painted in the bright McGinnis scheme of red-orange, black and white and the Herbert Matter designed "NH" logo. FL9s were initially fitted with the Hancock air whistle, a trademark of New Haven units of this time, instead of the standard air horns on diesel locomotives.

Operation
New Haven trackage between Woodlawn and New Haven, Connecticut, 72 miles east from Grand Central, was electrified in the early 1900s at 11,000 volts, 25 Hz AC overhead. The New Haven was the pioneer of heavy mainline railroad electrification in the United States. Early plans to extend the catenary to Boston were never completed due to the perennial financial problems that plagued the New Haven almost continuously from the 1920s to its demise in 1969. This left a gap between New Haven and Boston, requiring trains between those cities to stop in New Haven to switch between diesel and electric locomotives. This extended travel time, which the New Haven sought to reduce.

The FL9s allowed through passenger trains from Grand Central Terminal to reach Boston, Springfield, and other non-electrified destinations without the need for an engine change at New Haven. They were purchased with the intent of allowing the eventual elimination of all New Haven electric locomotives and the abandonment of the electrification east of Stamford, Connecticut, 33 miles from Grand Central. The fact that the entire New York to Boston line is now electrified shows the short-sightedness of this concept, which had been adopted by the McGinnis management to avoid the cost of modernizing the New Haven's Cos Cob, Connecticut power plant. The New Haven to Boston electrification was finally completed by Amtrak in 1999.

Prior to the introduction of the FL9, all non-multiple unit New Haven passenger trains were hauled by electric locomotives between New York and New Haven, with a change to steam (before 1950) or diesel at New Haven. Meeting the weight limits of the Park Avenue Viaduct in Manhattan, the FL9 made it possible to eliminate the engine change and allow trains to reach Grand Central in less time. FL9s were used on the New Haven's premier name train, the Merchants Limited, which covered the 229.5 miles between Grand Central Terminal and South Station, Boston in 4 hours 15 minutes.

Introduction of the FL9 allowed the New Haven to scrap its entire fleet of pre-1955 electric locomotives, many of which were less than 25 years old. The FL9 had higher operating costs and lower performance than the electric locomotives it replaced, but was more flexible as it could go where electric locomotives could not. The only New Haven electrics surviving through the FL9 period were the General Electric EP5 "Jets" of 1955 as well as the freight service General Electric E33s purchased secondhand from the Virginian Railway in 1959.  Even though one EP5 was as powerful as three FL9s, the powerful "Jets" were doomed by poor maintenance, and the last were retired in 1977, after having been regeared for freight service by inheritor Penn Central in 1973. In keeping with the New Haven's policy of dual service utilization of locomotives, FL9s were used at night to move a Trailer-on-FlatCar (TOFC) train, with difficulty, in one direction between the Cedar Hill yard in New Haven and the Oak Point yard in The Bronx. Assigned to this train in the other direction, an EP5 locomotive could easily outrun automobile traffic on the adjacent Connecticut Turnpike.

The FL9s were considered to be under-powered compared to the powerful electrics they replaced, which also had their problems. For other reasons, the New Haven never abandoned its electrification, negating the primary reason for purchasing the FL9s. Their ability to avoid the engine change in New Haven allowed them to remain in service on trains that travelled in non-electrified territory, and they could also be operated like conventional diesel locomotives.

Penn Central and beyond 
In 1969, the New Haven FL9 fleet passed to Penn Central upon the merger of the Pennsylvania Railroad and New York Central Railroad, as the ICC required the newly formed company to assume control of the bankrupt New Haven. Some were repainted in Penn Central schemes, while others remained in their former New Haven paint. When the New York Metropolitan Transportation Authority (MTA) began funding these commuter services in 1970, many were repainted blue with a bright yellow nose, although they remained Penn Central-owned.  The locomotives passed to Conrail upon its formation in 1976 from the bankrupt PC. Twelve FL9s were sold to Amtrak, six of which were remanufactured by Morrison-Knudsen starting in 1978 and remained in Amtrak service until at least 1996.

In 1983, Conrail passed its commuter operations to state agencies. In New York State, the MTA formed Metro-North Railroad as a subsidiary company to operate these, and operations in Connecticut under contract with that state. The locomotives were repainted in Metro-North colors (more commonly in a silver, blue, and red scheme; some in a silver and blue scheme), and a large number of them, now in some cases over 25 years old, were rebuilt and modernized. Ten rebuilt for the Connecticut Department of Transportation (CDT) were painted in the original New Haven paint scheme in recognition of their original operator. This tradition has continued with other remanufactured locomotives in the CDT's Shore Line East service pool, as well as on four new GE Genesis II P32AC-DM dual-mode locomotives and six Brookville BL20GH Diesel-electric locomotives.

By the beginning of the 21st century, the worn-out FL9s were approaching a service life of 50 years and were gradually replaced by newer, more powerful locomotives. The FL9s were restricted to branch lines near the end of their lives since they no longer had the ability to operate on third rail power. Metro-North and Connecticut DOT, along with the Housatonic Railroad, operated a "Farewell to the FL9's" fan trip from Stamford, CT to Canaan, CT and return on October 23, 2005. The last FL9 to see passenger service was in late 2009, the same year Metro-North retired all its remaining FL9s. Six ConnDOT-owned locomotives were sold to other operators or museums by the end of 2018.

The dual-power concept pioneered by the FL9 has been continued by the P32AC-DM and EMD DM30AC, both which remain on Amtrak, Metro-North and the Long Island Rail Road.

Original owners

Surviving examples

Several FL9s exist today, donated to several museums and railways.
 All Amtrak units were purchased by the Morristown and Erie Railway, New Jersey, but many were scrapped or cannibalized for parts.
 488-489 operated on the Maine Eastern Railroad, pulling several excursion trains between Brunswick and Rockland, Maine until the railroad ceased operations in 2015. They were then used in excursion service at the Whippany Railway Museum until October 2020, when Morristown and Erie sold the two units to Webb Rail LLC.

 484 was first owned by the Cuyahoga Valley Scenic Railroad. It was eventually transferred to the Orford Express in eastern Quebec, Canada, and operated until the line closed on October 8, 2020. Plans for the locomotive and the rest of the rolling stock are unknown.
 2023 (formerly New Haven #2057) is preserved at the Connecticut Eastern Railroad Museum.
 All remaining ConnDOT-owned units (2011, 2014, 2016, 2019, 2024, 2026, 2027) were sold to private owners by 2018, as follows:
 2011 & 2026 are in service and maintained on the Massachusetts Coastal Railroad/Cape Cod Central Railroad in Massachusetts.
 2014 & 2016 are in ownership of the Grapevine Vintage Railroad as of October 2019. They are used on GVRX excursion trains between Grapevine-Main Street station and The Fort Worth Stockyards.
 2019 (formerly New Haven #2049) is in ownership of the Railroad Museum of New England. It was in operation at the Streamliners at Spencer event in North Carolina from May 29, 2014 to June 1, 2014. It is now used to pull RMNE's Northern Lights Limited holiday train on the Naugatuck Railroad during the winter season.
 2024 is in ownership of the Webb Rail LLC (WEBX).
 2027 is now owned by the Boston Surface Railroad, and is planned to operate in commuter service over the Providence & Worcester Railroad between the railroad's namesake cities in Rhode Island and Massachusetts.
 The Railroad Museum of New England currently has two FL9s awaiting restoration: the oldest surviving FL9, New Haven No. 2005 (currently numbered as No. 2002) as well as the very last EMD F-unit ever built, New Haven No. 2059 (current painted in Metro-North livery as Metro-North No. 2033).
 Two FL9s, No. 2006 and No. 2013, are preserved at the Danbury Railway Museum. No. 2006 wears the New Haven Livery, while 2013 wears New York Central livery, despite the NYC never owning any FL9s.

In popular culture
In 1978, FL9 #5048 was used in the filming of the original Superman movie starring Christopher Reeve. Still painted in New Haven livery, the unit was depicted pulling a commuter train past the entrance to Lex Luthor's hideout during the villain's introduction scene.

See also 

 List of GM-EMD locomotives
 List of GMD Locomotives
British Rail Class 28 CoBo
P32AC-DM - a similar dual-power locomotive derived from a diesel-electric locomotive.
DM30AC - a similar dual-power locomotive derived from a diesel-electric locomotive.

References

Further reading

External links
Locomotive data sheet

B-A1A locomotives
Electric locomotives of the United States
Electro-diesel locomotives
F09L
New York, New Haven and Hartford Railroad locomotives
North American streamliner trains
600 V DC locomotives
Passenger locomotives
Diesel-electric locomotives of the United States
Railway locomotives introduced in 1956
Amtrak locomotives
Standard gauge locomotives of the United States
Streamlined diesel locomotives